Rhys Parry Jones is a Welsh actor best known for his role as Llew Matthews in , in the S4C children's series  and as Rhacsyn from the children's series Rhacsyn a’r Goeden Hud. Jones has also featured in episodes of EastEnders, Tracy Beaker and the BBC Wales sitcom High Hopes as well as providing the voices of Patrick, Mr Krabs, Painty The Pirate, Mermaid Man, and Larry in S4C's Welsh dubbing of SpongeBob SquarePants.

In late 2007, he appeared in Flick, a Welsh horror film co-starring Faye Dunaway, Hugh O'Conor and Michelle Ryan.

in 2011, he became one of four voice actors in S4C’s Welsh dub of SpongeBob SquarePants, along side Dewi Rhys Williams, Richard Elfyn and Siân Naomi. he provided the voices of Patrick, Mr Krabs, Painty The Pirate, Mermaid Man, and Larry.

In 2018, he portrayed John Le Mesurier in Amazon's A Very English Scandal. In 2019, he appeared in the Netflix series The Crown, in the season 3 episode "Aberfan".

References

External links
 Rhys Parry Jones at the British Film Institute
 

Living people
Place of birth missing (living people)
Welsh male film actors
Welsh male television actors
Year of birth missing (living people)